Hartopp is a surname. Notable people with the surname include:

Hartopp baronets
Sir Edmund Cradock-Hartopp, 1st Baronet
Edward Hartopp (disambiguation), multiple people
Sir John Hartopp, 3rd Baronet, English politician
William Hartopp (1836–1874), English cricketer and soldier